Oese or OESE may refer to:

Oese, Pärnu County, a village in Halinga Parish, Pärnu County, Estonia
Oese, Rapla County, a village in Vigala Parish, Rapla County, Estonia
Oese (Hönne), a river in  North Rhine-Westphalia, Germany, tributary of the Hönne
Öse, a river in  North Rhine-Westphalia, Germany, tributary of the Nethe (the umlaut Ö may be spelled as Oe)
Office of Elementary and Secondary Education (OESE), a division of the United States Department of Education